Celiptera frustulum, the black bit moth, is a moth of the family Erebidae. It is found in eastern North America, as far north as Ontario.

The wingspan is 34–41 mm. Adults are on wing from May to June in two generations.

The larvae feed on Robinia pseudoacacia.

References

External links
Bug Guide
Images

Moths of North America
Moths described in 1852
Celiptera